"Tajdar-e-Haram" is a qawwali performed by the Pakistani musical group, Sabri Brothers and written by Mirza Muhammad Hakim,  a 16th century Mughal prince and brother to Emperor Akbar.

1982 version 

In 1982, Sabri Brothers recorded this qawwali for Pakistani film Sahaaray.

2015 version 

In 2015, it was rendered by Atif Aslam, during Coke Studio season 8 episode 1. It was considered to be produced by Strings. Atif Aslam revealed that the track was produced by Shiraz Uppal. This was a tribute paid by Atif to Sabri Brothers.

Credits 

 Artist – Atif Aslam
 Guest Musician – Tanveer Tafu (Rubab), Arsalan Rabbani (Harmonium)
 Humnawa – Jamshed Ali Sabri, Naveed Ali Sabri, Mohammad Shan, Zahid Akhtar
 Houseband – Complete (except Aahad)

Popularity 
The music video features Atif Aslam. It is the first Pakistani music video to cross 100 million views on YouTube. The official video has garnered over 342 million views on YouTube, and became the most viewed Youtube video of Pakistani-origin, as of January 2022, leaving behind Rahat Fateh Ali Khan & Momina Mustehsan's rendition of Afreen Afreen having 336 million views. It has received over 5 million engagements and has been viewed in 186 countries worldwide.

Reception 
Amjad Sabri the son of Ghulam Farid Sabri said, "I really like how the music was arranged. Atif didn't do badly. I wish he could have worked on his diction a little more, as long as the essence remains untouched, there is no harm." He further said, "it was an honest accolade to his father and uncle". British High Commissioner Christian Turner took to Twitter that his friend suggested him "Tajdar-e-Haram" by Atif Aslam and he thoroughly enjoyed it. In return, Atif also thanked him.

2018 version 

In 2018 Bollywood film Satyameva Jayate, it was recreated by Sajid–Wajid and sung by Wajid from the same duo. It released on 16 July 2018.

Credits 

 Singer – Wajid 
 Music –  Sajid – Wajid 
 Lyrics By – Danish Sabri 
 Theme Designed And Arranged By – Sajid Wajid 
 Song Programmed By – Aditya Dev 
 Sajid Wajid's Assistant – Ashish Sehgal & Rahul Kothari 
 Mix Assistant Engineers – Michael Edwin Pillai 
 Song Mixed And Mastered By Eric Pillai (Future Sound Of Bombay)

Critical reception 
The song received negative reviews. It was not liked by audience. The filmmakers were criticized for making such song. It was said to be disaster, disrespectful and blasphemous.

Version listings

Summary of versions

See also 

 Afreen Afreen
Tera Woh Pyar
 Atif Aslam discography
 Coke Studio (Pakistani season 8)

References 

Atif Aslam songs
Coke Studio (Pakistani TV program)
1970 songs
2015 singles
Urdu-language songs
Pakistani songs